Huaca is a genus of true weevils in the family of beetles known as Curculionidae. There are at least 20 described species in Huaca.

Species
These 26 species belong to the genus Huaca:

 Huaca apian Clark, 1993 i c b
 Huaca ayacho Clark, 1993 c
 Huaca cajana Clark, 1993 c
 Huaca capi Clark, 1993 c
 Huaca cauas Clark, 1993 c
 Huaca cicui Clark, 1993 c
 Huaca cinca Clark, 1993 c
 Huaca collana Clark, 1993 c
 Huaca cuipan Clark, 1993 c
 Huaca cumpi Clark, 1993 c
 Huaca curvicrus Clark, 1993 c
 Huaca guayra Clark, 1993 i c b
 Huaca matoro Clark, 1993 c
 Huaca mayu Clark, 1993 c
 Huaca mudca Clark, 1993 c
 Huaca pacha Clark, 1993 c
 Huaca payan Clark, 1993 c
 Huaca picas Clark, 1993 c
 Huaca puquiu Clark, 1993 c
 Huaca quilca Clark, 1993 c
 Huaca quillo Clark, 1993 c
 Huaca quisco Clark, 1993 c
 Huaca sucanca Clark, 1993 c
 Huaca turuca Clark, 1993 c
 Huaca usno Clark, 1993 c
 Huaca uxi Clark, 1993 c

Data sources: i = ITIS, c = Catalogue of Life, g = GBIF, b = Bugguide.net

References

Further reading

External links

Curculioninae
Articles created by Qbugbot
Curculionidae genera